The rivers and water bodies of Montreal are few and mostly artificial. Hydrography of the island of Montreal remained intact until approximately XIXth where Montreal will undergo major urban works including the construction of Lachine Canal and the creation of the first major parks of Montreal.

History

Last Ice Age

After the Ice Age, around -13 000 years, Montreal and the Saint Lawrence Lowlands are flooded by the Champlain sea. Within a few centuries, as and when these waters recede, the Mount Royal and its three summits are emerged into islands. With the complete withdrawal of the sea, water is retained in some depression of the island. This is the case among other Beaver Lake, located in the palm of Mount Royal. This will dry gradually to become a fen. He was regrooved artificially in 1938.

Before XIXth

There used to be a complex hydrographic, now destroyed or channeled.

It was backfilled and gradually dried up, particularly with the construction of the Lachine Canal and with the industrialization of the sector. The highway 20 runs through the length and breadth of today in the center.
Saint Pierre River: started in Côte-des-Neiges down to Notre-Dame-de-Grâce and widening formed Lake Otter. It then returns to the river and leads to St. Lawrence River in Nuns' Island.
 Little St. Pierre River: created artificially in 1697 under the name of "St. Gabriel canal". This channel connects the Saint-Pierre River (in the east part of Lake Otter) up the Pointe-à-Callière Museum. One part was channeled as qu'égout (William collector) in 1832. The Pointe-à-Callière Museum would make the public place around 2017.
 Saint Martin River or Little River: It begins at Mount Royal Cemetery through Outremont, Quebec and the Mile End and Plateau Mont-Royal until La Fontaine Park (including the pond is a remnant). There are still some traces of the river.

Today 

Today there are only a handful of streams and lakes in nature. However, many parks have ponds or artificial lakes of large size.

List of water bodies

Below is a partial list of current waters bodies of the island:

List of rivers

 Rivière à l'Orme
 Bertrand Brook
 Saint-Pierre River (Montreal)
 Lachine Canal
 Aqueduct Canal
 St. Lawrence River
 Prairie River (Montreal)

References

See also

 Blue Network of Montreal
 List of rivers of Quebec
 List of canals of Quebec

Rivers
Montreal Island
Montreal Island